Cénac-et-Saint-Julien is a commune in the Dordogne department in Nouvelle-Aquitaine in southwestern France.

Geography
The river Céou, a tributary of the Dordogne, forms part of the commune's south-western border; the Dordogne forms most of its northern border.

The Commune has one main high street. That is in a N-S axis. It is the main road to Sarlat across one of the many bridges that cross the Dordogne to the north.

Population

Amenities
In summer time you can hire canoes for use on the river on the western southern bank near the bridge.

There is one main shopping center with a petrol station opposite. A pharmacy, grocers, a pizza house, bakers, and two taverns, one having a restaurant. There is also a primary school.

Sport
On Saturdays Rugby seems to be the main occupation on the fields to the south.  The enthusiasm and cheering echoes through the valley.

Events
A farmers market is held regularly in the central market area which also does clothes and handicrafts.

Sights
Cenac has a romanesque church, Ste. Marie, to the west, on the road that leads to Saint-Julien. It is nearly always open for visitors.

To the east roads go up and down from the famous bastide town of Domme. Drivers should be aware that the southernmost road is one way only down (except for access).

One other interesting thing is that Cenac retains its old communal washhouse in almost perfect condition.

See also
Communes of the Dordogne department

References

Communes of Dordogne